Diana Reynell (9 September 1933 – 1 August 2017) was a leading grotto designer and restorer.

Early life

Reynell was born Diana Baldwin on 9 September 1933 to Joseph Baldwin, an Oxfordshire bank manager, and his wife. Diana's mother and brother died in childbirth when she was three years old. She was educated at schools in Witney and Faringdon in Oxfordshire and The Kingsley School in Warwickshire. She subsequently studied at an art school in Oxford ( but not The Ruskin ) where she met her future husband Antony Reynell.

Career
After her marriage in 1955, Reynell joined her husband at Marlborough College where he taught classics and she taught jewellery design. The couple had four children.

Reynell's first grotto restoration was of a room dug into the Marlborough Mound for Lady Hertford at Marlborough College.

In the late-1980s, she created the shellwork in the subterranean grotto at Leeds Castle and restored the grotto at Hampton Court House.

Death
Reynell died on 1 August 2017 from the effects of lung cancer and Parkinson's disease.
She had a beautiful home burial in her garden attended by all her family and friends in glorious sunshine .

References

External links 

Grottoes
English landscape and garden designers
Deaths from lung cancer
Deaths from Parkinson's disease
Neurological disease deaths in the United Kingdom
Deaths from cancer in the United Kingdom
1933 births
2017 deaths